(born April 27, 1968) is a retired female long-distance runner from Japan.

International competitions

References

1968 births
Living people
Japanese sportsperson-politicians
Japanese female long-distance runners
Japanese female marathon runners
Olympic female long-distance runners
Olympic athletes of Japan
Athletes (track and field) at the 1988 Summer Olympics
Asian Games bronze medalists for Japan
Asian Games medalists in athletics (track and field)
Athletes (track and field) at the 1990 Asian Games
Medalists at the 1990 Asian Games
World Athletics Championships athletes for Japan
Japan Championships in Athletics winners